Adam's Marble is an album by Graham Collier. It was recorded in 1995 and includes three suites composed by Graham Collier in different times. The title track "Adam's Marble" was composed in 1986 for the tour in Israel that Collier had that year, and is dedicated to Adam Baruch, the producer of the album, and also the owner of the label JazzIS; "Bright As Silver" was composed to accompany Adam Baruch for the concerts and recording in the same venue. The piece "Aberdeen Angus" dates back to 1967, and is a reworking of the track included in the album Down Another Road.

Track listing
All compositions by Graham Collier.
 "Bright As Silver (for Don & John)" - 23:44
 "Aberdeen Angus" - 9:16
 "Adam's Marble" - 20:39

Personnel
Mihaly Biggs - Acoustic Bass
Stephen Main - Alto Saxophone
Uri Shamir - Bass Guitar
Harold Rubin - Clarinet
Rassell Morgan, Shahar Haziza - Drums
Ron Веt Sira - Electric Piano
Patrick White - Flugelhorn
Eldad Tsabari - Flute
Yiftach Kadan - Guitar
Rassell Morgan - Percussion
Peter James - Piano
Daniel Frankel, Stephen Main - Soprano Saxophone
Boris Malkovsky - Synthesizer
Mitchell Rosen - Tenor Saxophone
Matt Colman, Rafi Malkiel - Trombone
Patrick White - Trumpet
Graham Collier - Conductor

References

Graham Collier albums
1995 albums